Rend Each Other Like Wild Beasts, Till Earth Shall Reek With Midnight Massacre is an EP by Gnaw Their Tongues, released on May 16, 2009 by At War With False Noise.

Track listing

Personnel
Adapted from the Rend Each Other Like Wild Beasts, Till Earth Shall Reek With Midnight Massacre liner notes.
 Maurice de Jong (as Mories) – vocals, instruments, recording, cover art

Release history

References

External links 
 
 Rend Each Other Like Wild Beasts, Till Earth Shall Reek With Midnight Massacre at Bandcamp

2009 EPs
Gnaw Their Tongues albums